Norwood Memorial Municipal Building (Norwood Town Hall) is a historic building located in Norwood, Massachusetts, United States.

The Late Gothic Revival building was built in 1927-28, and is made of Weymouth seamed-face granite. Visitors often mistake it for a church or believe it to have been a church, but it never was; its stained-glass windows depict not saints, but local patriot Aaron Guild.

"Guild", whose name appears in local street and building names, is pronounced with a long i, like the second syllable of the word "beguiled".

Guild's significance is explained by an inscription on the Aaron Guild Memorial Stone, dedicated in 1903, which stands outside the Norwood public library. The inscription reads:
NEAR THIS SPOT
CAPT. AARON GUILD
ON APRIL 19, 1775
LEFT PLOW IN FURROW, OXEN STANDING
AND DEPARTING FOR LEXINGTON
ARRIVED IN TIME TO FIRE UPON
THE RETREATING BRITISH.

Guild and his oxen are featured in the town seal.

The building includes a 50-bell carillon tower housing the Walter F. Tilton Memorial Carillon, one of nine carillons in Massachusetts and the seventh-largest in the United States.

The building was added to the National Register of Historic Places in 1996.

See also
National Register of Historic Places listings in Norfolk County, Massachusetts

References

Government buildings on the National Register of Historic Places in Massachusetts
Buildings and structures in Norfolk County, Massachusetts
Government buildings completed in 1927
Norwood, Massachusetts
National Register of Historic Places in Norfolk County, Massachusetts